Kani Miran may refer to:
 Kani Miran, Kurdistan
 Kani Miran, Mahabad, West Azerbaijan Province
 Kani Miran, Urmia, West Azerbaijan Province